Maritsauá (Manitsawá) is an extinct Tupian language of the state of Mato Grosso, in the Amazon region of Brazil.

References

Tupian languages
Extinct languages of South America